Arameans are an ancient Semitic-speaking people in the Middle East.

Aramean may also refer to:

 Aram-Naharaim, which includes the kingdoms of Aram Damascus and Aram Rehob
 Aramaic language
 Neo-Aramaic languages
 Aramean identity, a term for Syriac Christians

See also
 Aram (disambiguation)